

Canberra Raiders Cup (First Grade) 
The 2019 Canberra Raiders Cup will be the 22nd season of the cup, the top division Rugby League club competition in Canberra. The 2019 Canberra Raiders Cup will consist of 18 regular season rounds that will begin on the 7th of April and ended on the 18th of August. There will be 3 playoff rounds, beginning on the 24th of August with the first semi-final, and ending on the 8th of September with the grand final. Woden Valley Rams are the defending premiers.

Teams 
There will be 9 teams playing in 2019. 5 teams from Canberra, 2 from Queanbeyan, 1 from Yass, and 1 from Goulburn.

All 9 clubs will field a team in the reserve grade competition.

Ladder

Ladder progression 

 Numbers highlighted in green indicate that the team finished the round inside the top 4.
 Numbers highlighted in blue indicates the team finished first on the ladder in that round.
 Numbers highlighted in red indicates the team finished last place on the ladder in that round.
 Underlined numbers indicate that the team had a bye during that round.

Round 1

Round 2

Round 3

Round 4

Round 5

Round 6

Round 7

Round 8

Round 9

Round 10

Round 11

Round 12

Round 13

Round 14

Round 15

Round 16

Round 17

Round 18

Finals series

George Tooke Shield (Second Division)

Teams 
There will be 9 teams playing in 2019. 3 teams from Canberra. 6 teams from New South Wales towns surrounding Canberra.

Ladder

Ladder progression 

 Numbers highlighted in green indicate that the team finished the round inside the top 5.
 Numbers highlighted in blue indicates the team finished first on the ladder in that round.
 Numbers highlighted in red indicates the team finished last place on the ladder in that round.
 Underlined numbers indicate that the team had a bye during that round.

Round 1

Round 2

Round 3

Round 4

Round 5

Round 6

Round 7

Round 8

Round 9

Round 10

Round 11

Round 12

Round 13

Round 14

Round 15

Round 16

Round 17

Round 18

Finals series

Senior Competition results

Reserve Grade

Standings

Finals series

Under 19's

Standings

Division 1 Finals series

Division 2 Finals series

Ladies League Tag

Standings

Finals series

Ladies League Tag Second Division

Standings

Finals series

Open Women's Tackle

Standings

Finals series

Junior grand finals

Under 16's

Division 1

Division 2

Under 18's Girls

Under 15's Girls

Under 15's

Division 1

Division 2

Under 14's

Division 1

Division 2

Under 13's

Division 1

Division 2

Under 12's

Division 1

Division 2

Division 3

Under 11's

Division 1

Division 2

Division 3

Under 10's

Division 1

Division 2

Division 3 

2019 in Australian rugby league